"Planetarium" (プラネタリウム Puranetariumu) is Ai Otsuka's tenth single, which was released on 21 September 2005. The single had great success and became Otsuka's second #1 hit on the Oricon charts, selling  316,425 copies. In 2005, Planetarium sold 215,114 copies, making it the #41 best-selling single of the year. However, it still charted into the next year and was the #99 best-selling single in 2006, selling 100,555 copies.  Planetarium is her second best-selling single after "Sakuranbo."

"Planetarium" was featured on Ai Otsuka's studio-album Love Cook. It was also used as an OST for the Japanese drama "Hana Yori Dango".

Track listing

Certifications

References

2005 singles
Ai Otsuka songs
Japanese television drama theme songs
Oricon Weekly number-one singles

Songs written by Ai Otsuka
2005 songs
Avex Trax singles